Wybraniec is a surname. Notable people with this surname include:
Antonín Wybraniec, Czech athlete, Bronze medalist at Athletics at the 1979 Summer Universiade – Men's discus throw
Grzegorz Wybraniec, cello player, guest musician on black metal album Puritanical Euphoric Misanthropia by Norwegian band Dimmu Borgir
Jindřich Wybraniec (born 1948), Czech sprint canoer
Marian Wybraniec, Polish architect, helped design Christ the King Statue, Świebodzin
Urszula Wybraniec-Skardowska (born 1940), Polish logician